ZEP-RE (PTA Reinsurance Company) is a specialised institution of the Common Market for Eastern and Southern Africa (COMESA) created under charter. The Company is currently headquartered in Nairobi, Kenya.

Overview
ZEP-RE (PTA Reinsurance Company) is an institution of the Common Market for Eastern and Southern Africa (COMESA), established by an Agreement signed by Heads of States and Governments on 23 November 1990 in Mbabane, Swaziland. The signatory Member States to the Agreement establishing the Company include: Angola, Burundi, Comoros, Democratic Republic of Congo, Djibouti, Eritrea, Ethiopia, Kenya, Lesotho, Madagascar, Malawi, Mauritius, Mozambique, Rwanda, Somali, Sudan, Tanzania, Uganda, Zambia and Zimbabwe. As a result of the multinational agreement the company was formed in 1992.

The key objectives of the company as outlined in its charter include fostering the development of the insurance and reinsurance industry in the COMESA sub-region, promotion of the growth of national, sub-regional and regional underwriting and retention capacities and supporting sub-regional economic development.

Credit rating
ZEP-RE is rated of B++ (Financial Strength Rating) and ‘bbb’ (Long-Term Issuer Credit Rating) by A.M. Best. The Company also holds a claim paying ability rating of AA+ with the Global Credit Rating (GCR) agency of South Africa.

Shareholders
As of December 2016, ZEP-RE has 36 shareholders composed of COMESA member states and institutional shareholders
 Government of Djibouti
 Government of Kenya
 Government of Mauritius 
 Government of Rwanda 
 Government of Sudan 
 Government of Zambia
 AfDB
 DEG
 GXA
 SOCABU
 Assurances BICOR
 Kenya-Re
 Blue Shield Insurance Company
 Mayfair Insurance Company Ltd.
 Apollo Insurance Company Ltd.
 EMOSE
 SONARWA
 SORAS
 United Insurance Company Ltd. (Sudan)
 Sheikan Ins. & Reins. Ltd
 Juba Insurance Company Ltd
 National Insurance Corporation Ltd. (Tanzania)
 Zanzibar Insurance Corporation
 PPF
 National Insurance Corporation Ltd. (Uganda)
 Lion Assurance of Uganda Ltd.
 Statewide Insurance Company Ltd
 Zambia State Insurance Corporation Ltd.
 Zambia State Insurance Corporation – Pension Trust
 COMESA Secretariat
 TDB
 Baobab Reinsurance Company Ltd.
 CMAR (NY Havana)
 SONAS 
 National Insurance Corporate of Eritrea S.C.
 Amerga

Locations
ZEP-RE is headquartered in Nairobi, Kenya with regional and operates hubs and country offices in Cameroon, Cote d’Ivoire, Ethiopia, Democratic Republic of Congo, Uganda, Zambia, Zimbabwe and Sudan. It enjoys mandatory concessions that grant it at least 10% of the reinsurance business in several countries.

See also
Trade and Development Bank

References

External links

Financial services companies established in 1990
Companies based in Nairobi
Reinsurance companies
1990 establishments in Africa